This article is an outline about bicycles themselves. For an outline about cycling, the associated activity, see outline of cycling.

The following outline is provided as an overview of and topical guide to bicycles:

Bicycle – pedal-driven, human-powered, single-track vehicle, having two wheels attached to a frame, one behind the other. A person who rides a bicycle is called a cyclist or a bicyclist, and the activity is called cycling.  Also known as a bike, push bike or cycle.

What type of thing is a bicycle? 
Bicycles can be described as all of the following:
 a component of transport
 a component of a mode of transport
 a component of road transport
 a type of vehicle
 Human-powered transport

Types of bicycles 

 29er hybrid bike
 Art bike
 Clown bicycle
 Dekochari
 Tall bike
 Autobike
 Balance bicycle
 Bamboo bicycle
 Beach cruiser
 Belt-driven bicycle
 Bicycle trailer
 Big Wheel (tricycle)
 Billboard bicycle
 BMX bike
 Boda-boda
 Cardboard bicycle
 Cargo bike
 Chainless bicycle
 Chopper bicycle
 Raleigh Chopper
 Chukudu
 City bike
 Clown bicycle
 Conference Bike
 Cruiser bicycle
 Cycle rickshaw
 Cyclo-cross bicycle
 Dekochari
 Dicycle
 Electric bicycle
 European city bike
 Faired bicycle
 Fatbike
 Flat bar road bike
 Folding bicycle
 Birdy (bicycle)
 Gearbox bicycle
 Handcycle
 Hybrid bicycle
 Hydrogen bicycle
 Ice cycle
 Infantry bicycle
 Islamic bicycle
 Longtail bicycle
 Lowrider bicycle
 Military bicycle
 Swedish military bicycle
 Swiss army bicycle
 Monowheel
 Motorized bicycle
 Derny
 VéloSoleX
 Mountain bike
 Mountain bike with 26 inch wheel
 27.5 Mountain bike (27.5 inch wheel)
 29er (29 inch wheel)
 Downhill bike
 Party Bike
 Path Racer
 Penny-farthing
 Police bicycle
 Portable bicycle
 Porteur bicycle
 Prone bicycle
 Racing bicycle
 Railbike
 Randonneur
 Recumbent bicycle
 Whike
 Road bicycle
 Roadster bicycle
 Rowing cycle
 Scraper bike
 Shaft-driven bicycle
 Sideways bike
 Single-speed bicycle
 Fixed-gear bicycle
 Small wheel bicycle
 Stationary bicycle
 Swing Bike
 Tall bike
 Tandem bicycle
 Sociable
 Time trial bicycle
 Touring bicycle
 Track bicycle
 Trailer bike
 Treadle bicycle
 Triathlon bicycle
 Utility cycling
 Velocipede
 Dandy horse
 Velomobile
 Wheelie bike
 Wooden bicycle
 Workbike
 Xtracycle

History of bicycles

History of the bicycle
bicycle craze

Key developments
Draisine, dandy horse, or Laufmaschine
Boneshaker
Velocipede
Penny-farthing, high wheel, high wheeler, or ordinary
Safety bicycle

People

Early developers
Karl von Drais
Thomas Humber
Pierre Lallement
Thomas McCall
John McCammon
Eugène Meyer
Pierre Michaux
Mikael Pedersen
Albert Augustus Pope
John Kemp Starley

Other developers
Al Fritz

Mountain bike developers
Gary Fisher
Charlie Kelly
Joe Breeze
Keith Bontrager

Other notable cyclists
Lenz, Frank
Murphy, Charles Minthorn, also known as Mile-a-Minute Murphy
Taylor, Marshall Walter, also known as Major Taylor

Racing authors
Eddie Borysewicz
Greg LeMond
Joe Parkin
Davis Phinney
Bob Roll
Connie Carpenter
Lance Armstrong

Other authors
Brown, Sheldon (bicycle mechanic)
Forester, John ("the father of Vehicular Cycling")
Byrne, David (musician and artist)
Herlihy, David V. (historian)

Organizations
Adventure Cycling Association
Cycling club
American Bicycling Education Association
International Cycling History Conference
International Mountain Bicycling Association
League of American Bicyclists
Mountain Bike Hall of Fame
National Off-Road Bicycle Association
Union Cycliste Internationale
USA Cycling
World Human Powered Vehicle Association

Technical aspects
The bicycle has undergone continual adaptation and improvement since its inception. These innovations have continued with the advent of modern materials and computer-aided design, allowing for a proliferation of specialized bicycle types.

Uses
Bicycles have been and are employed for many uses:
Cycling – use of bicycles for transport, recreation, or for sport.
Transport: bicycle-sharing system
Utility: bicycle commuting and utility cycling
Work: mail delivery, paramedics, police, couriering, and general delivery.
Recreation: bicycle touring, mountain biking, BMX and physical fitness.
Racing: track racing, criterium, roller racing and time trial to multi-stage events like the Tour of California, Giro d'Italia, the Tour de France, the Vuelta a España, the Volta a Portugal, among others.
Military: scouting, troop movement, supply of provisions, and patrol. See bicycle infantry.
Show: entertainment and performance, e.g. circus clowns. Used as instrument by Frank Zappa.

Types of bicycles

List of bicycle types
Bicycles can be categorized in different ways: e.g. by function, by number of riders, by general construction, by gearing or by means of propulsion. The more common types include utility bicycles, mountain bicycles, racing bicycles, touring bicycles, hybrid bicycles, cruiser bicycles, and BMX Bikes. Less common are tandems, lowriders, tall bikes, fixed gear, folding models and recumbents (one of which was used to set the IHPVA Hour record).

Unicycles, tricycles and quadracycles are not strictly bicycles, as they have respectively one, three and four wheels, but are often referred to informally as "bikes".

Dynamics

Bicycle and motorcycle dynamics
countersteering
stoppie
Two-mass-skate bicycle
wheelie

Performance

Bicycle performance
cadence
Cycling records
Hour record

Geometry

Bicycle and motorcycle geometry
Q factor (bicycles)

Construction and parts
In its early years, bicycle construction drew on pre-existing technologies. More recently, bicycle technology has in turn contributed ideas in both old and new areas.

For details on specific bicycle parts, see list of bicycle parts and :category:bicycle parts.

Frame
Bicycle frame - The great majority of today's bicycles have a frame with upright seating which looks much like the first chain-driven bike.

By design:

folding bicycle
portable bicycle
recumbent bicycle
step-through frame
mixte
open frame
sociable
tandem bicycle

By frame material:

bamboo bicycle
cardboard bicycle
plastic bicycle
wooden bicycle

Brands and makers of unusual frames:
Humber Cycles
Pedersen bicycle
Zipp 2001

Suspension
Bicycle suspension

Drivetrain and gearing
Bicycle drivetrain systems
Bicycle gearing

Power collection
bottom bracket
cranks
pedals
treadle

Power transmission
chain
chainline
shaft drive
belt-driven bicycle

Power modification
bicycle gearing
 gear inches
derailleur gears
electronic gear-shifting system
gearbox bicycle
hub gear
 shifter
single-speed bicycle

Power application
cassette
freewheel

Steering and seating
handlebars
fork
 fork tube
stem
headset
recumbent steering
Bicycle saddle
Bicycle seat

Brakes
Bicycle brake

Wheels and tires
Bicycle wheel
wheelset
Bicycle tire
slick tire
knobby tire
tubular tire
tubes
Valve stem

Tracks
Some bicycles are built for specific tracks:
Hotchkiss Bicycle Railroad
Shweeb
Or special tracks are built specifically for bicycles:
Trampe bicycle lift
(Also see Cycling infrastructure)

Bicycle accessories 
Bicycle accessories

 Bicycle basket
 Bicycle bell
 Bicycle helmet
 Bicycle lighting and bicycle reflector
 Bicycle pump and  inflator
 Bicycle rollers
 Bicycle tools
 Bicycle trailer
 Bicycle trainer
 Bike lock
 Bottle cages and water bottles
 Chainguard
 Child seats
 Clipless pedals
 Cycling power meter
 Cyclocomputer and cycling power meter
 Kick stand
 Luggage carrier
 Mudguard or fender
 Panniers
 Saddlebag
 Sidecar
 Tire lever
 Toe-clips and toestraps
 Training wheels

Bicycle tools 
Bicycle tools

 Bicycle pump
 Chain tool
 Chain whip
 Cone wrench
 Hex key
 Peanut butter wrench
 Spoke wrench
 Tire lever
 Wheel truing stand

Standards
A number of formal and industry standards exist for bicycle components to help make spare parts exchangeable and to maintain a minimum product safety.

The International Organization for Standardization, ISO, has a special technical committee for cycles, TC149, that has the following scope: "Standardization in the field of cycles, their components and accessories with particular reference to terminology, testing methods and requirements for performance and safety, and interchangeability."

CEN, European Committee for Standardization, also has a specific Technical Committee, TC333, that defines European standards for cycles. Their mandate states that EN cycle standards shall harmonize with ISO standards. Some CEN cycle standards were developed before ISO published their standards, leading to strong European influences in this area. European cycle standards tend to describe minimum safety requirements, while ISO standards have historically harmonized parts geometry. The TC149 ISO bicycle committee, including the TC149/SC1 ("Cycles and major sub-assemblies") subcommittee, has published the following standards:
 ISO 4210 Cycles—Safety requirements for bicycles
 ISO 6692 Cycles—Marking of cycle components
 ISO 6695 Cycles—Pedal axle and crank assembly with square end fitting—Assembly dimensions
 ISO 6696 Cycles—Screw threads used in bottom bracket assemblies
 ISO 6697 Cycles—Hubs and freewheels—Assembly dimensions
 ISO 6698 Cycles—Screw threads used to assemble freewheels on bicycle hubs
 ISO 6699 Cycles—Stem and handlebar bend—Assembly dimensions
 ISO 6701 Cycles—External dimensions of spoke nipples
 ISO 6742 Cycles—Lighting and retro-reflective devices—Photometric and physical requirements
 ISO 8090 Cycles—Terminology (same as BS 6102–4)
 ISO 8098 Cycles—Safety requirements for bicycles for young children
 ISO 8488 Cycles—Screw threads used to assemble head fittings on bicycle forks
 ISO 8562 Cycles—Stem wedge angle
 ISO 10230 Cycles—Splined hub and sprocket—Mating dimensions
 ISO 11243 Cycles—Luggage carriers for bicycles—Concepts, classification and testing

Other ISO Technical Committees have published various cycle relevant standards, for example:
 ISO 5775 Bicycle tire and rim designations
 ISO 9633 Cycle chains—Characteristics and test methods

Published cycle standards from CEN TC333 include:
 EN 14764 City and trekking bicycles – Safety requirements and test methods
 EN 14765 Bicycles for young children – Safety requirements and test methods
 EN 14766 Mountain-bicycles – Safety requirements and test methods
 EN 14781 Racing bicycles – Safety requirements and test methods
 EN 14872 Bicycles – Accessories for bicycles – Luggage carriers
 EN 15496 Cycles – Requirements and test methods for cycle locks

Yet to be approved cycle standards from CEN TC333:
 EN 15194 Cycles—Electrically power assisted cycles (EPAC bicycle)
 EN 15532 Cycles—Terminology
 00333011 Cycles – Bicycles trailers – safety requirements and test methods

Social and historical aspects

The bicycle has had a considerable effect on human society, in both the cultural and industrial realms.
List of films about bicycles and cycling

Economic implications

Bicycle industry
World Bicycle Relief
Mass production
Planned obsolescence
List of bicycle manufacturing companies

In daily life
Bicycle commuting
community bicycle programs
Trampe bicycle lift

In poverty reduction

Bicycle poverty reduction

 Baisikeli Ugunduzi
 Bikes Not Bombs
 Bikes to Rwanda
 BikeTown Africa
 Pedaling to Freedom
 With My Own Two Wheels
 World Bicycle Relief
 Working Bikes

Legal requirements

The Vienna Convention on Road Traffic of the United Nations considers a bicycle to be a vehicle, and a person controlling a bicycle (whether actually riding or not) is considered an operator.
 Bicycle law

See also
General
 Cycling
 History of cycling
 Glossary of cycling
 Mountain Bike
 Mountain Biking
 Bicycle locker
 List of bicycle and human powered vehicle museums
 List of bicycle brands and manufacturing companies

Related vehicle types

 Quadracycle
 Tricycle
 Unicycle
 Self-balancing unicycle
 Motorcycle

Other
 Outline of motorcycles and motorcycling
 Safety standards
 Transportation technology, timeline of

References 

 
Bicycles
Bicycles
Bicycles